Antonio Gutiérrez Limones (born January 6, 1963, in Seville, Spain) is a Spanish politician and senator. He is the Chairman of the Foreign Relations Committee of the Spanish Senate. He was elected senator on May 21, 2019, after the general elections.

Early life and education 
Gutiérrez Limones was born January 6, 1963, in Seville, Andalusia, Spain. He attended the University of Seville where he studied Law and graduated with a BSc and subsequently obtained a master's degree in local development. Limones also has a Master's degree in business management from the same university.

Political career

Career in local politics 
Gutiérrez Limones began his political career running as Mayor of Alcalá de Guadaíra. On May 28, 1995, during the general municipality elections he won the election as Mayor of Alcala de Guadaira. He was elected Mayor of the 3rd city of Province of Seville. In June 1999, he was reelected as Mayor.

Senate mandate 
During the 2008 general elections Gutiérrez Limones contested as senator under the Spanish Socialist Workers' Party for the Seville (Congress of Deputies constituency) and won with approximately 574,240 votes. He is a member of the Permanent Deputation of Spain. In November 2011, he was re-elected into the Senate of Spain. In the senate he was appointed Vice-chairman of Foreign Affairs and Local Entities committees in the Senate of Spain. He is a member of the Spanish delegation to the Parliamentary Assembly of the Council of Europe.

Congress of Deputies 
In the 2015 elections, Gutiérrez Limones was elected into the Congress of Deputies of Spain. He was re-elected on the event of the early legislative elections of June 2016 which he then tendered his resignation from his mandate as mayor in accordance with the statutes of the party from May 5. He retains all of his parliamentary powers.

In addition to his committee assignments, Gutiérrez Limones has been a member of the Spanish delegation to the Parliamentary Assembly of the Council of Europe since 2012. In this capacity, he has served on the Committee on Political Affairs and Democracy (since 2019); the Committee on the Honouring of Obligations and Commitments by Member States of the Council of Europe (Monitoring Committee) (since 2019); the Committee on Legal Affairs and Human Rights (2016–2019); the Committee on Social Affairs, Health and Sustainable Development (2014–2016); the Committee on Equality and Non-Discrimination (2012–2014); and the Committee on Culture, Science, Education and Media (2012–2016). Since 2016, he has been one of the Assembly’s vice-presidents.

Alleged funds embezzlement 
In June 2017, an investigating Judge in Seville asked the Supreme Court in Spain to indict Gutiérrez Limones over an alleged embezzlement of public funds meant for Alcalá Comunicación Municipal. The case was file and opened in the supreme court in November 2017 but in April 2018 the case was dismissed from the Supreme Court of Spain due to the statute of limitations of the facts alleged against him.

References 

Living people
1963 births
People from Seville
University of Seville alumni
Members of the 14th Senate of Spain
Spanish Socialist Workers' Party politicians
Members of the 13th Senate of Spain
Deputy Prime Ministers of Spain
Members of the 11th Senate of Spain
Members of the 12th Senate of Spain
Politicians from Andalusia